The 2017–2018  Jordanian Pro League (known as the Al-Manaseer Jordanian Pro League, named after Ziyad AL-Manaseer Companies Group for sponsorship reasons) was the 66th season of Jordanian Pro League since its inception in 1944.

Al-Faisaly are the defending champions of the 2016–17 season. Shabab Al-Aqaba and Al-Yarmouk entered as the two promoted teams.

On 3 May 2018, Al-Wehdat won their 16th Premier League title, after Mansheyat Bani Hasan beat Al-Faisaly 2–1 in round 21 and before the final round of the league.

Al-Faisaly's Łukasz Gikiewicz won the Golden Boot with 14 goals.

Teams
The league comprises 12 teams, 10 from the 2016–17 campaign, as well as two teams promoted from the 2016–17 Division 1.

Stadiums and locations

Personnel and kits

Managerial changes

Foreign players
The number of foreign players is limited to 3 per team, and should not be a goalkeeper.

Results

League table
Note: Teams tied on points are ranked on head-to-head record.

Results table

Season progress

Statistics

Top scorers

Hat-tricks

Number of teams by Governorates

References

Jordanian Pro League seasons
2017–18 in Jordanian football
Jordan Prenier League